The Green Rust is a 1919 crime novel by the British writer Edgar Wallace. An American detective battles an evil Doctor who plans to destroy the world's wheat supplies.

Film adaptation
The same year it was made into a silent film The Green Terror directed by William Kellino and starring Heather Thatcher.

References

Bibliography
 Goble, Alan. The Complete Index to Literary Sources in Film. Walter de Gruyter, 1999.

1919 British novels
Novels by Edgar Wallace
British crime novels
British novels adapted into films